Aleksandra Artyomenko (14 January 1928 – 25 September 2010) was a Soviet alpine skier. She competed in three events at the 1956 Winter Olympics.

References

1928 births
2010 deaths
Soviet female alpine skiers
Olympic alpine skiers of the Soviet Union
Alpine skiers at the 1956 Winter Olympics
Sportspeople from Krasnoyarsk Krai